Koparkhairane is a railway station (KPHN)) on the Trans-Harbour line of the Indian Mumbai Suburban Railway network In Navi Mumbai, Maharashtra, India. KoparKhairane Railway Station is also a junction station and fast local trains also halts at KoparKhairane railway station. 

Koparkhairane is local train railway station is on the Thane–Turbhe–Nerul/Vashi Railway Line which was commissioned on 9 November 2004.

The railway station is located in Sector 8A of the node. It is accessible from both the Thane–Belapur road on the eastern side and the Kopar Khairane node on the western side. Koparkhairane is the fifth railway station on the Thane–Koparkhairane–Vashi/Nerul Rail Corridor, a 23-km-long corridor connecting Thane with Navi Mumbai.

As of 2008, there were seventeen services a day on this rail line in either direction. There are 212 trains that pass through daily the Kopar Khairane Railway station. Some of the major trains passing through KPHN are - (PANVEL Fast & Slow, BELAPUR CBD Slow, Vashi slow,  etc). It takes 15 minutes to reach Nerul & 11 minutes to reach Vashi Railway Station. Also (As of 2022) KoparKhairane Railway Station is connected to Thane, Vashi, Nerul & Panvel.

Stationboard – Koparkhairane

Station Code - KPHN

References

Railway stations in Thane district
Mumbai Suburban Railway stations
Mumbai CR railway division
Railway stations opened in 2004